Vsevolod Sergeevich Tarasevich (24 November 1919  1998) was a Soviet photographer. His photographs were exhibited at the Multimedia Art Museum, Moscow in 2013.

References

Soviet photographers
1919 births
1998 deaths